Palangari-ye Now (also Romanized as Pālangarī-ye Now; also known as Hajungri, Ḩālūngarī ye, and Pālangarī) is a village in Kamfiruz-e Shomali Rural District, Kamfiruz District, Marvdasht County, Fars Province, Iran. At the 2006 census, its population was 1,025, in 259 families.

References 

Populated places in Marvdasht County